Harapan Kita Hospital may refer to:

 Pusat Jantung Nasional Harapan Kita, the National Heart Center in Jakarta
 RSAB Harapan Kita, a children's hospital in Jakarta